Igoe is a surname. Notable people with the surname include:

James T. Igoe, member of the United States House of Representatives, 1927–1932
Michael L. Igoe, member of the United States House of Representatives, 1935–1936
Sammy Igoe, English footballer
William L. Igoe, member of the United States House of Representatives, 1913–1921
 Tommy Igoe, drummer and music educator, 1964–
Wee Lauren Igoe, teacher from Glasgow, 1992-

See also
Pruitt–Igoe, a housing project of St. Louis, Missouri